Predictive policing is the usage of mathematics, predictive analytics, and other analytical techniques in law enforcement to identify potential criminal activity. A report published by the RAND Corporation identified four general categories predictive policing methods fall into: methods for predicting crimes, methods for predicting offenders, methods for predicting perpetrators' identities, and methods for predicting victims of crime.

Methodology
Predictive policing uses data on the times, locations and nature of past crimes to provide insight to police strategists concerning where, and at what times, police patrols should patrol, or maintain a presence, in order to make the best use of resources or to have the greatest chance of deterring or preventing future crimes. This type of policing detects signals and patterns in crime reports to anticipate if crime will spike, when a shooting may occur, where the next car will be broken into, and who the next crime victim will be. Algorithms are produced by taking into account these factors, which consist of large amounts of data that can be analyzed. The use of algorithms creates a more effective approach that speeds up the process of predictive policing since it can quickly factor in different variables to produce an automated outcome. From the predictions the algorithm generates, they should be coupled with a prevention strategy, which typically sends an officer to the predicted time and place of the crime. The use of automated predictive policing supplies a more accurate and efficient process when looking at future crimes because there is data to back up decisions, rather than just the instincts of police officers. By having police use information from predictive policing, they are able to anticipate the concerns of communities, wisely allocate resources to times and places, and prevent victimization.

Police may also use data accumulated on shootings and the sounds of gunfire to identify locations of shootings. The city of Chicago uses data blended from population mapping crime statistics to improve monitoring and identify patterns.

Other approaches 
Rather than predicting crime, predictive policing can be used to prevent it. The "AI Ethics of Care" approach recognizes that some locations have greater crime rates as a result of negative environmental conditions. Artificial intelligence can be used to minimize crime by addressing the identified demands.

History

Iraq 
At the end of destructive and violent combat operations in April 2003, Improvised Explosive Devices (IED)  were placed throughout the streets of Iraq to monitor and rebuttal against US military action with predictive policing. However, the amount of space the IEDs covered were too big for Iraq to take action against each American in the area. This problem introduced the concept of Actionable Hot Spots. Areas that had a lot of action, but were too large to control the areas. This caused Iraq military difficulties in determining the best location to focus surveillance, position snipers, and patrol the routes being observed and placed with the IEDs.

China
The roots of predictive policing can be traced to the policy approach of social governance, in which leader of the Chinese Communist Party Xi Jinping announced at a security conference in 2016 is the Chinese regime’s agenda to promote a harmonious and prosperous country through an extensive use of information systems. A common instance of social governance is the development of the social credit system, where big data is used to digitize identities and quantify trustworthiness. There is no other comparably comprehensive and institutionalized system of citizen assessment in the West.

The increase in collecting and assessing aggregate public and private information by China’s police force to analyze past crime and forecast future criminal activity is part of the government’s mission to promote social stability by converting intelligence-led policing (i.e. effectively using information) into informatization (i.e. using information technologies) of policing. The increase in employment of big data through the police geographical information system (PGIS) is within China’s promise to better coordinate information resources across departments and regions to transform analysis of past crime patterns and trends into automated prevention and suppression of crime. PGIS was first introduced in 1970s and was originally used for internal government management and research institutions for city surveying and planning. Since the mid-1990s PGIS has been introduced into the Chinese public security industry to empower law enforcement by promoting police collaboration and resource sharing. The current applications of PGIS are still contained within the stages of public map services, spatial queries, and hot spot mapping. Its application in crime trajectory analysis and prediction is still in the exploratory stage; however, the promotion of informatization of policing has encouraged cloud-based upgrades to PGIS design, fusion of multi-source spatiotemporal data, and developments to police spatiotemporal big data analysis and visualization.

Although there is no nationwide police prediction program in China, local projects between 2015 and 2018 have also been undertaken in regions such as Zhejiang, Guangdong, Suzhou, and Xinjiang, that are either advertised as or are building blocks towards a predictive policing system.

Zhejiang and Guangdong had established prediction and prevention of telecommunication fraud through the real-time collection and surveillance of suspicious online or telecommunication activities and the collaboration with private companies such as the Alibaba Group for the identification of potential suspects. The predictive policing and crime prevention operation involves forewarning to specific victims, with 9,120 warning calls being made in 2018 by the Zhongshan police force along with direct interception of over 13,000 telephone calls and over 30,000 text messages in 2017.

Substance-related crime is also investigated in Guangdong, specifically the Zhongshan police force who were the first city in 2017 to utilize wastewater analysis and data models that included water and electricity usage to locate hotspots for drug crime. This method led to the arrest of 341 suspects in 45 different criminal investigations by 2019.

In China, Suzhou Police Bureau has adopted predictive policing since 2013. During 2015–2018, several cities in China have adopted predictive policing. China has used predictive policing to identify and target people for sent to Xinjiang internment camps.

The integrated joint operations platform (IJOP) predictive policing system is operated by the Central Political and Legal Affairs Commission.

Europe
In Europe there has been significant pushback against predictive policing and the broader use of artificial intelligence in policing on both a national and European Union level.

The Danish POL-INTEL project has been operational since 2017 and is based on the Gotham system from Palantir Technologies. The Gotham system has also been used by German state police and Europol.

Predictive policing has been used in the Netherlands.

United States

In the United States, the practice of predictive policing has been implemented by police departments in several states such as California, Washington, South Carolina, Alabama, Arizona, Tennessee, New York, and Illinois.

In New York, the NYPD has begun implementing a new crime tracking program called Patterninzr. The goal of the Patternizr was to help aid police officers in identifying commonalities in crimes committed by the same offenders or same group of offenders. With the help of the Patternizr, officers are able to save time and be more efficient as the program generates the possible "pattern" of different crimes. The officer then has to manually search through the possible patterns to see if the generated crimes are related to the current suspect. If the crimes do match, the officer will launch a deeper investigation into the pattern crimes.

Concerns 
Predictive policing faces issues that affect its effectiveness. Obioha mentions several concerns raised about predictive policing. High costs and limited use prevent more widespread use, especially among poorer countries. Another issue that affects predictive policing is that it relies on human input to determine patterns. Flawed data can lead to biased and possibly racist results. Technology cannot predict crime, it can only weaponize proximity to policing. Though it is claimed to be unbiased data, communities of color and low income are the most targeted.  It should also be noted that not all crime is reported, making the data faulty and inaccurate.

In 2020, following protests against police brutality, a group of mathematicians published a letter in Notices of the American Mathematical Society urging colleagues to stop work on predictive policing. Over 1,500 other mathematicians joined the proposed boycott. 

Some applications of predictive policing have targeted minority neighborhoods and lack feedback loops.

Cities throughout the United States are enacting legislation to restrict the use of predictive policing technologies and other “invasive” intelligence-gathering techniques within their jurisdictions.

Following the introduction of predictive policing as a crime reduction strategy, via the results of an algorithm created through the use of the software PredPol, the city of Santa Cruz, California experienced a decline in the number of burglaries reaching almost 20% in the first six months the program was in place. Despite this, in late June of 2020 in the aftermath of the murder of George Floyd in Minneapolis, Minnesota along with a growing call for increased accountability amongst police departments, the Santa Cruz City Council voted in favor of a complete ban on the use of predictive policing technology.

Accompanying the ban on predictive policing, was a similar prohibition of facial recognition technology. Facial recognition technology has been criticized for its reduced accuracy on darker skin tones - which can contribute to cases of mistaken identity and potentially, wrongful convictions.

In 2019, Michael Oliver, of Detroit, Michigan, was wrongfully accused of larceny when his face registered as a “match” in the Data Works Plus software to the suspect identified in a video taken by the victim of the alleged crime. Oliver spent months going to court arguing for his innocence - and once the judge supervising the case viewed the video footage of the crime, it was clear that Oliver was not the perpetrator. In fact, the perpetrator and Oliver did not resemble each other at all  - except for the fact that they are both African-American which makes it more likely that the facial recognition technology will make an identification error.

With regards to predictive policing technology, the mayor of Santa Cruz, Justin Cummings, is quoted as saying, “this is something that targets people who are like me,” referencing the patterns of racial bias and discrimination that predictive policing can continue rather than stop.

For example, as Dorothy Roberts explains in her academic journal article, Digitizing the Carceral State, the data entered into predictive policing algorithms to predict where crimes will occur or who is likely to commit criminal activity, tends to contain information that has been impacted by racism. For example, the inclusion of arrest or incarceration history, neighborhood of residence, level of education, membership in gangs or organized crime groups, 911 call records, among other features, can produce algorithms that suggest the over-policing of minority or low-income communities.

See also 
 Quantitative methods in criminology
 Carding (police policy)
 Crime analysis
 Jurimetrics
 Pre-crime
 Crime hotspots
 Preventive state
 Racial profiling

Further reading

 Ludwig, Jens, and Sendhil Mullainathan. 2021. "Fragile Algorithms and Fallible Decision-Makers: Lessons from the Justice System". Journal of Economic Perspectives, 35 (4): 71–96.

References 

Criminology
Law enforcement techniques
Types of policing
Crime prevention
Government by algorithm